Echinolittorina biangulata is a species of sea snail in the Indo-West Pacific Ocean, a marine gastropod mollusk in the family Littorinidae, the winkles or periwinkles.

Description

Distribution

References

Littorinidae
Gastropods described in 1897